{{safesubst:#invoke:RfD|||month = March
|day = 17
|year = 2023
|time = 22:29
|timestamp = 20230317222947

|content=
redirectDefamation

}}